Starring Steve Alaimo is Steve Alaimo's fifth album and first for the label of ABC-Paramount.

Track listing

Side 1
 I Don't Know
 Ya-Ya
 Nobody Loves Me
 I Don't Wanna Cry
 Sammy Dead
 People Act Funny

Side 2
 Everybody Likes to Do the Ska
 Stand by Me
 Behold
 Soon You'll Be Gone
 You're Driving Me Crazy
 I Won't Let You Go

1965 albums
Steve Alaimo albums
ABC Records albums